Aboubakar Sangoulé Lamizana (31 January 1916 – 26 May 2005) was a Burkinabé military officer who served as the  President of Upper Volta (since 1984 renamed Burkina Faso), in power from 3 January 1966, to 25 November 1980. He held the additional position of Prime Minister from 8 February 1974, to 7 July 1978.

Biography 
After Upper Volta achieved complete independence from the French Union in 1960, opposition parties either merged with the governing party, Union démocratique voltaïque (UDV), or were banned, transforming Upper Volta into a single party state, headed by Maurice Yaméogo as President. Yaméogo's one-party regime elicited much unrest; student strikes and mass demonstrations by students, labor unions, and civil servants. Yaméogo was forced to resign after a general strike and a military coup on 3 January 1966, giving power to General Sangoulé Lamizana on the demonstrators' demand.

Lamizana served as nominal head of a "provisional military government" until a new Constitution, ratified on 14 June 1970, provided for a four-year transition to fully civilian elected leadership; he was also foreign minister from 1966 to 1967. Elections under the new Constitution delivered a clear majority of the assembly to the UDV.

In the early 1970s the effect of a five-year drought and increasing desertification in the Sahel brought the threat of famine to several nations including Upper Volta. The resulting economic dislocation encouraged factionalism in the government, headed by Gérard Kango Ouédraogo, the prime minister who had been appointed by Lamizana. Again military intervention and dissolution of the assembly brought Lamizana back in control, essentially now as dictator.

Lamizana's regime had international recognition and visited with U.S. President Richard Nixon. On 15 October 1973 Lamizana met with President Nixon and briefed him on the Sahel drought in the Oval Office. Lamizana explained that he represented himself and the other Sahel governments and hoped to secure aid during the famine and drought. Nixon promised to provide as much help as he could.

His personal party following was styled the National Movement for Renewal, although that became a short-lived formation. A new Constitution was written and approved in a referendum in 1977, and Lamizana was reelected in open elections in 1978; this election is generally considered as being among the most democratic ever held in West Africa. Later Lamizana joined UDV.

With the support of unions and civil groups, Col. Saye Zerbo overthrew Lamizana in a bloodless military coup in November 1980.

See also
 1966 Upper Voltan coup d'état

References

External links
 Kenneth Janda, "Political Parties: A Cross-National Survey": Upper Volta
 Burkina Faso brief history

1916 births
2005 deaths
Burkinabé military personnel
Foreign ministers of Burkina Faso
Heads of state of Burkina Faso
Burkinabé Muslims
Leaders who took power by coup
Leaders ousted by a coup
Prime Ministers of Burkina Faso
21st-century Burkinabé people